Tesla, Inc. has several factory buildings in the industrial zone of Vossenberg, Tilburg, in the Netherlands.  In December 2012, a European Distribution Centre in Tilburg was announced, acting as the European parts and services headquarters.  The Tesla Tilburg assembly plant handled final assembly of Tesla Model S/X electric vehicles for delivery within Europe.

Buildings
The factory buildings are close to the Wilhelmina Canal allowing for water-based delivery of intermodal containers arriving via the Port of Rotterdam.

European distribution centre
The first  Tesla facility started production of completed Tesla Model S cars on 22 August 2013.  It was Tesla's first factory outside California.

Final assembly plant

By late 2015, the assembly plant was in the process of doubling capacity from 200 cars per week, to 450 cars per week. The factory used for final assembly has a 3.4-megawatt rooftop photovoltaic power station. Vehicles arrive from the Tesla Factory in Fremont, California with the interior fully fitted out to the customer's requested color combination. The battery pack and electric drive-train components are shipped separately. As of the 2021 S/X refresh, Tesla is no longer using this facility for S/X assembly, but it may be repurposed.

Third building
The building had been certified by BREEAM as having a "very good" sustainability rating. Dutch newspaper Algemeen Dagblad reported that it was likely to be used by Tesla for electric vehicle parts distribution.

In October 2017, the original developers  had sold the nearly-completed building to Standard Life Aberdeen investment organisation.

See also 
 Tesla Fremont Factory
 Gigafactory Nevada
 Gigafactory New York
 Gigafactory Shanghai
 Gigafactory Texas
 Gigafactory Berlin-Brandenburg
 List of Tesla factories

References

External links
 
 

Tesla factories
Motor vehicle assembly plants in the Netherlands